Lambi may refer to:

Lambi or Lamba (Faroe Islands), a village
Lambi (Vidhan Sabha constituency) in Punjab, India